Live & Filthy is a live album by The Sex Pistols that was released in 2008.

Track listing
"Anarchy in the U.K." (live)
"No Feelings" (live)
"Liar" (live)
"I Wanna Be Your Dog" (live)
"No Fun" (live)
"New York" (live)
"Seventeen" (live)
"Don't Gimme No Lip, Child" (live)
"Pretty Vacant" (live)
"I Wanna Be Me" (live)
"Search and Destroy" (live)
"Substitute" (live)
"I'm a Lazy Sod" (live)
"Submission" (live)
"C'mon Everybody" (live)
"Satellite Kid" (live)
"Chatterbox" (live)
"Somethin' Else" (live)
"Tight Pants" (live)
"No Lip" (live)  
"Belsen Was a Gas" (live)
"(I'm Not Your) Stepping Stone" (live)
"My Way" (alternate version) (live)

Sex Pistols live albums
2008 live albums